Andalusia is a city in and the county seat of Covington County, Alabama, United States. At the 2020 census, the population was 8,805.

History

Andalusia was first settled in 1841 after flooding of the Conecuh River and the surrounding lowlands forced citizens to move to higher ground. The county seat was moved from Montezuma to Andalusia in 1844. Andalusia likely got its name from Spanish explorers or settlers since the land where the town is located was part of Spanish Florida until Pinckney's Treaty in 1795. Andalusia shares its name with the autonomous community of Andalusia in southern Spain. The new town was originally called "New Site" but was known as Andalusia by the time a post office was established in 1846.

Andalusia was incorporated as a town in 1884.

In 1899, two railroad lines arrived in Andalusia, the Central of Georgia and the L & N Railroad, and the town began to grow.

The Avant House is one of seven sites in Andalusia listed on the National Register of Historic Places.

Geography
Andalusia is located slightly northwest of the center of Covington County at  (31.309, -86.479).

Climate
The climate in this area is characterized by hot, humid summers and generally mild to cool winters. According to the Köppen Climate Classification system, Andalusia has a humid subtropical climate, abbreviated "Cfa" on climate maps.

Demographics

Andalusia

Andalusia first appeared on the 1880 U.S. Census as an unincorporated village. It formally incorporated in 1884. See Andalusia Precinct/Division below.

2020 census

As of the 2020 United States census, there were 8,805 people, 3,490 households, and 2,147 families residing in the city.

2010 census
At the 2010 census there were 9,015 people in 3,694 households, including 2,359 families, in the city. The racial makeup of the city was 70.5% White, 25.9% Black or African American, 0.4% Native American, 1.0% Asian, 0.0% Pacific Islander, 0.4% from other races, and 1.7% from two or more races. 1.9% of the population were Hispanic or Latino of any race.
Of the 3,694 households 26.7% had children under the age of 18 living with them, 40.9% were married couples living together, 18.3% had a female householder with no husband present, and 36.1% were non-families. 31.3% of households were one person and 14.9% were one person aged 65 or older. The average household size was 2.35 and the average family size was 2.93.

The age distribution was 23.4% under the age of 18, 9.2% from 18 to 24, 23.6% from 25 to 44, 25.1% from 45 to 64, and 18.7% 65 or older. The median age was 39.7 years. For every 100 females, there were 86.6 males. For every 100 females age 18 and over, there were 91.2 males.

The median household income was $28,049 and the median family income was $37,059. Males had a median income of $27,228 versus $25,855 for females. The per capita income for the city was $19,544. About 20.2% of families and 22.8% of the population were below the poverty line, including 35.4% of those under age 18 and 14.5% of those age 65 or over.

2000 Census data
As of the census of 2000, there were 8,794 people in 3,707 households, including 2,376 families, in the city. The racial makeup of the city was 73.93% White, 24.47% Black or African American, 0.36% Native American, 0.27% Asian, 0.02% Pacific Islander, 0.18% from other races, and 0.76% from two or more races. 0.78% of the population were Hispanic or Latino of any race.

Of the 3,707 households 27.9% had children under the age of 18 living with them, 46.5% were married couples living together, 14.4% had a female householder with no husband present, and 35.9% were non-families. 33.3% of households were one person and 17.1% were one person aged 65 or older. The average household size was 2.29 and the average family size was 2.91.

The age distribution was 23.2% under the age of 18, 8.4% from 18 to 24, 25.0% from 25 to 44, 22.6% from 45 to 64, and 20.8% 65 or older. The median age was 40 years. For every 100 females, there were 84.4 males. For every 100 females age 18 and over, there were 79.5 males.

The median household income was $26,856 and the median family income was $37,091. Males had a median income of $29,406 versus $20,410 for females. The per capita income for the city was $17,292. About 15.7% of families and 20.6% of the population were below the poverty line, including 28.6% of those under age 18 and 18.9% of those age 65 or over.

Andalusia Precinct/Division (1880-)

Andalusia Beat (Precinct) (Covington County 1st Beat) first appeared on the 1880 U.S. Census. In 1890, "beat" was changed to "precinct." In 1960, the precinct was changed to "census division" as part of a general reorganization of counties. In 1980, three additional census divisions were consolidated into Andalusia, including Andalusia East, Andalusia West and Red Level.

Andalusia East Census Division (1960-70)

Andalusia East Census Division was created in 1960 and contained the towns of Babbie, Heath, Libertyville and Sanford. In 1980, it was consolidated into Andalusia Census Division.

Andalusia West Census Division (1960-70)

Andalusia West Census Division was created in 1960. It did not contain any incorporated communities, and included the rural area west of the city of Andalusia to the Conecuh County line. In 1980, it was consolidated into Andalusia Census Division.

Media
Cable TV Station
WKNI 25 community interests 
Radio stations
WAAO-FM 93.7 FM  (Country)
WSTF 91.5 FM (Religious)
WFXX FOX 107.7 FM (Adult Contemporary)
Newspaper
Andalusia Star-News (daily)

Education
Primary and secondary public education is provided by Andalusia City Schools, which consists of Andalusia Elementary School (Pre-K through 6th Grade), Andalusia Jr. High School (7th and 8th Grade), and Andalusia High School (9th through 12th Grade).  Students can continue their studies at Lurleen B. Wallace Community College.

Transportation
Intercity bus service is provided by Greyhound Lines.

Sites on the National Register of Historic Places 
The Bank of Andalusia 
Avant House
Central of Georgia Depot, now converted into the Three Notch Museum
Covington County Courthouse and Jail
First National Bank Building

Notable people 
 Harold Albritton,  U.S. district court judge
 Dempsey J. Barron, President of the Florida Senate from 1975 to 1976
 Charles Brooks, editorial cartoonist
 James U. Cross, retired U.S. Air Force brigadier general and chief Air Force One pilot under president Lyndon B. Johnson
 Cecil O. De Loach, Jr., California grape-grower and winemaker
 Quinton Dial, defensive tackle for the Alabama Crimson Tide
 Irwin Gunsalus, biochemist; assistant secretary general at the United Nations
 Seth Hammett, Speaker of the Alabama House of Representatives
 Robert Horry, basketball player, one of only two players to have won the National Basketball Association championship with three different teams
 Nico Johnson, one of two members of the University of Alabama's football team to start in their National Championship victories in 2009, 2011 and 2012
 Alexa Jones, Miss Alabama 2005 and Miss America 2006 (second runner-up)
 T. D. Little, member of Alabama Senate and House of Representatives
 Lamar Morris, country music singer
 Frank J. Tipler, mathematical physicist and cosmologist; author of books and papers about a mechanism for the resurrection of the dead

Gallery

References

External links

City of Andalusia official website
Andalusia Area Chamber of Commerce

Cities in Alabama
Cities in Covington County, Alabama
County seats in Alabama
Populated places established in 1841
1841 establishments in Alabama